Raj Bhavan, West Bengal may refer to:

 Raj Bhavan, Darjeeling, official residence of the governor of West Bengal, located in Darjeeling.
 Raj Bhavan, Kolkata, official residence of the governor of West Bengal, located in Kolkata.